Courtney Kenny may refer to:
 Courtney Kenny (New Zealand politician)
 Courtney Kenny (British politician)